Bulhary (before 1949 Pulgary) is a municipality and village in Břeclav District in the South Moravian Region of the Czech Republic. It has about 700 inhabitants. It lies on the Thaya river. Bulhary is partly located within the Lednice–Valtice Cultural Landscape, a UNESCO World Heritage Site.

History
The area of the village and its surroundings has been inhabited since time immemorial due to the fertile soil and proximity to the river. At the hill Syslí kopec is an archeological site where the remains of mammoth hunters weapons (28–24,000 years BC old) were found. The first written mention of Bulhary is from 1244.

Economy
Bulhary is known for viticulture. The municipality lies in the Mikulovská wine subregion. The tradition dates back to the 13th century.

References

External links

 

Villages in Břeclav District